The Houston Astros' 2011 season was the 50th season for the franchise in the National League in Houston, their 47th as the Astros and their 12th season at Minute Maid Park. The 2011 Astros became the first team in the franchise's 50-year history to lose 100 games in a single season.

Regular season

Season standings

Record vs. opponents

Detailed record

Roster

Game log

|-  style="text-align:center; background:#fbb;"
|1||April 1||@Phillies||4–5||Báez (1–0)||Lyon (0–1)||||45,237||Citizens Bank Park||0–1||L1
|-  style="text-align:center; background:#fbb;"
|2||April 2||@Phillies||4–9||Lee (1–0)||W. Rodríguez (0–1)||||45,455||Citizens Bank Park||0–2||L2
|-  style="text-align:center; background:#fbb;"
|3||April 3||@Phillies||3–7||Oswalt (1–0)||Norris (0–1)||||45,562||Citizens Bank Park||0–3||L3
|-  style="text-align:center; background:#fbb;"
|4||April 5||@Reds||2–8||Leake (1–0)||Happ (0–1)||||11,821||Great American Ball Park||0–4||L4
|-  style="text-align:center; background:#fbb;"
|5||April 6||@Reds||4–12||Volquez (1–0)||Figueroa (0–1)||||17,719||Great American Ball Park||0–5||L5
|-  style="text-align:center; background:#bfb;"
|6||April 7||@Reds||3–2||Abad (1–0)||Masset (0–1)||Lyon (1)||20,104||Great American Ball Park||1–5||W1
|-  style="text-align:center; background:#fbb;"
|7||April 8||Marlins||3–4||Nolasco (1–0)||López (0–1)||Núñez (2)||41,042||Minute Maid Park||1–6||L1
|-  style="text-align:center; background:#fbb;"
|8||April 9||Marlins||5–7||Vasquez (1–1)||Abad (1–1)||Núñez (3)||25,421||Minute Maid Park||1–7||L2
|-  style="text-align:center; background:#bfb;"
|9||April 10||Marlins||7–1||Happ (1–1)||Sánchez (0–1)||||22,299||Minute Maid Park||2–7||W1
|-  style="text-align:center; background:#fbb;"
|10||April 11||Cubs||4–5||Dempster (1–2)||Figueroa (0–2)||Mármol (4)||20,175||Minute Maid Park||2–8||L1
|-  style="text-align:center; background:#bfb;"
|11||April 12||Cubs||11–2||Myers (1–0)||Russell (1–1)||||23,523||Minute Maid Park||3–8||W1
|-  style="text-align:center; background:#fbb;"
|12||April 13||Cubs||5–9||Zambrano (2–0)||W. Rodríguez (0–2)||||20,987||Minute Maid Park||3–9||L1
|-  style="text-align:center; background:#bfb;"
|13||April 14||Padres||1–0||Norris (1–1)||Moseley (0–3)||Lyon (2)||20,045||Minute Maid Park||4–9||W1
|-  style="text-align:center; background:#fbb;"
|14||April 15||Padres||2–4||Harang (3–0)||Happ (1–2)||Bell (3)||23,755||Minute Maid Park||4–10||L1
|-  style="text-align:center; background:#bfb;"
|15||April 16||Padres||5–3||Melancon (1–0)||Latos (0–2)||Lyon (3)||28,100||Minute Maid Park||5–10||W1
|-  style="text-align:center; background:#fbb;"
|16||April 17||Padres||6–8||Frieri (1–1)||Melancon (1–1)||Bell (4)||22,899||Minute Maid Park||5–11||L1
|-  style="text-align:center; background:#bfb;"
|17||April 19||@Mets||6–1||W. Rodríguez (1–2)||Niese (0–3)||||27,032||Citi Field||6–11||W1
|-  style="text-align:center; background:#bfb;"
|18||April 20||@Mets||4–3||Melancon (2–1)||Dickey (1–3)||Lyon (4)||27,380||Citi Field||7–11||W2
|-  style="text-align:center; background:#fbb;"
|19||April 21||@Mets||1–9||Capuano (2–1)||Happ (1–3)||||32,819||Citi Field||7–12||L1
|-  style="text-align:center; background:#fbb;"
|20||April 22||@Brewers||7–14||Gallardo (2–1)||Figueroa (0–3)||||31,907||Miller Park||7–13||L2
|-  style="text-align:center; background:#bfb;"
|21||April 23||@Brewers||9–6 (10)||Lyon (1–1)||Green (0–1)||||37,068||Miller Park||8–13||W1
|-  style="text-align:center; background:#fbb;"
|22||April 24||@Brewers||1–4||Wolf (3–2)||W. Rodríguez (1–3)||Axford (4)||32,323||Miller Park||8–14||L1
|-  style="text-align:center; background:#bfb;"	
|23||April 26||Cardinals||6–5||Lyon (2–1)||Boggs (0–1)||||25,526||Minute Maid Park||9–14||W1	
|-  style="text-align:center; background:#fbb;"
|24||April 27||Cardinals||5–6||Lohse (4–1)||Happ (1–4)||Sánchez (1)||27,857||Minute Maid Park||9–15||L1	
|-  style="text-align:center; background:#fbb;"
|25||April 28||Cardinals||7–11||McClellan (4–0)||Abad (1–2)||Salas (1)||26,331||Minute Maid Park||9–16||L2
|-  style="text-align:center; background:#fbb;"	
|26||April 29||Brewers||0–5||Marcum (3–1)||Myers (1–1)||||25,734||Minute Maid Park||9–17||L3
|-  style="text-align:center; background:#bfb;"	
|27||April 30||Brewers||2–1||Lyon (3–1)||Loe (2–2)||||26,514||Minute Maid Park||10–17||W1	
|-

|-  style="text-align:center; background:#bfb;"	
|28||May 1||Brewers||5–0||Norris (2–1)||Narveson (1–2)||||23,908||Minute Maid Park||11–17||W2
|-  style="text-align:center; background:#bbb;"	
|–||May 2||@Reds||colspan=7|Postponed (rain); Makeup: May 5, 11:35 AM CDT||Rain1	
|-  style="text-align:center; background:#bfb;"	
|29||May 3||@Reds||10–4||Happ (2–4)||Leake (3–1)||||12,005||Great American Ball Park||12–17||W3
|-  style="text-align:center; background:#fbb;"		
|30||May 4||@Reds||2–3||Cordero (2–0)||Lyon (3–2)||||12,340||Great American Ball Park||12–18||L1
|-  style="text-align:center; background:#fbb;"	
|31||May 5||@Reds||4–10||Bailey (1–0)||Myers (1–2)||||14,765||Great American Ball Park||12–19||L1
|-  style="text-align:center; background:#bfb;"		
|32||May 6||@Pirates||3–2||W. Rodríguez (2–3)||Resop (1–1)||Melancon (1)||12,728||PNC Park||13–19||W1
|-  style="text-align:center; background:#fbb;"	
|33||May 7||@Pirates||1–6||Morton (4–1)||Norris (2–2)||||32,299||PNC Park||13–20||L1
|-  style="text-align:center; background:#fbb;"	
|34||May 8||@Pirates||4–5||McCutchen (1–0)||Abad (1–3)||Hanrahan (10)||17,946||PNC Park||13–21||L2
|-  style="text-align:center; background:#fbb;"		
|35||May 9||Reds||1–6||Wood (2–3)||A. Rodríguez (0–1)||||20,174||Minute Maid Park||13–22||L3
|-  style="text-align:center; background:#fbb;"	
|36||May 10||Reds||7–3||Bailey (2–0)||Myers (1–3)||||24,499||Minute Maid Park||13–23||L4
|-  style="text-align:center; background:#bfb;"	
|37||May 11||Reds||4–3||Melancon (3–1)||Leake (3–2)||||21,008||Minute Maid Park||14–23||W1
|-  style="text-align:center; background:#fbb;"		
|38||May 13||Mets||4–6||Misch (1–0)||Fulchino (0–1)||Rodríguez (11)||28,791||Minute Maid Park||14–24||L1
|-  style="text-align:center; background:#bfb;"	
|39||May 14||Mets||7–3||Happ (3–4)||Dickey (1–5)||||31,140||Minute Maid Park||15–24||W1
|-  style="text-align:center; background:#fbb;"		
|40||May 15||Mets||4–7||Capuano (3–4)||A. Rodríguez (0–2)||Rodríguez (12)||28,406||Minute Maid Park||15–25||L1	
|-  style="text-align:center; background:#fbb;"	
|41||May 16||@Braves||2–3||Hanson (5–3)||Abad (1–4)||Kimbrel (11)||17,416||Turner Field||15–26||L2
|-  style="text-align:center; background:#fbb;"	
|42||May 17||@Braves||1–3 (11)||Gearrin (1–1)||Fulchino (0–2)||||21,085||Turner Field||15–27||L3
|-  style="text-align:center; background:#fbb;"	
|43||May 18||@Cardinals||1–5||Lohse (5–2)||Norris (2–3)||||35,298||Busch Stadium||15–28||L3
|-  style="text-align:center; background:#fbb;"		
|44||May 19||@Cardinals||2–4||McClellan (6–1)||Happ (3–5)||Salas(5)||36,409||Busch Stadium||15–29||L4
|-  style="text-align:center; background:#bfb;"	
|45||May 20||@Blue Jays||5–2||López (1–1)||Francisco (1–1)||Melancon (2)||15,478||Rogers Centre||16–29||W1
|-  style="text-align:center; background:#fbb;"	
|46||May 21||@Blue Jays||5–7||Janssen (1–0)||Myers (1–4)||Dotel (1)||21,494||Rogers Centre||16–30||L1
|-  style="text-align:center; background:#bfb;"		
|47||May 22||@Blue Jays||3–2||W. Rodríguez (3–3)||Drabek (3–3)||Melancon (3)||19,487||Rogers Centre||17–30||W1
|-  style="text-align:center; background:#bfb;"	
|48||May 23||Dodgers||4–3||Fulchino (1–2)||Jansen (1–1)||||22,579||Minute Maid Park||18–30||W2
|-  style="text-align:center; background:#fbb;"		
|49||May 24||Dodgers||4–5||Billingsley (3–4)||Happ (3–6)||||28,713||Minute Maid Park||18–31||L1
|-  style="text-align:center; background:#bfb;"		
|50||May 25||Dodgers||2–1||Melancon (4–1)||Guerrier (2–3)||||21,350||Minute Maid Park||19–31||W1
|-  style="text-align:center; background:#fbb;"	
|51||May 27||Diamondbacks||6–7||Hudson (6–4)||López (1–2)||Putz (15)||21,834||Minute Maid Park||19–32||L1
|-  style="text-align:center; background:#fbb;"	
|52||May 28||Diamondbacks||3–11||Duke (1–0)||Norris (2–4)||||31,405||Minute Maid Park||19–33||L2
|-  style="text-align:center; background:#fbb;"	
|53||May 29||Diamondbacks||2–4||Heilman (4–0)||Fulchino (1–3)||Putz (16)||21,882||Minute Maid Park||19–34||L3
|-  style="text-align:center; background:#bfb;"		
|54||May 30||@Cubs||12–7||Escalona (1–0)||Samardzija (3–1)||||30,450||Wrigley Field||20–34||W1
|-  style="text-align:center; background:#bfb;"		
|55||May 31||@Cubs||7–3||F. Rodriguez (1–0)||Mármol (1–2)||||31,178||Wrigley Field||21–34||W2
|-

|-  style="text-align:center; background:#bfb;"	
|56||June 1||@Cubs||3–1||Myers (2–4)||Davis (0–4)||Melancon (4)||31,340||Wrigley Field||22–34||W3
|-  style="text-align:center; background:#bfb;"	
|57||June 2||@Padres||7–4||Norris (3–4)||Stauffer (1–4)||Melancon (5)||16,635||Petco Park||23–34||W4
|-  style="text-align:center; background:#fbb;"	
|58||June 3||@Padres||1–3||Mosley (2–6)||Happ (3–7)||Bell (15)||20,056||Petco Park||23–35||L1
|-  style="text-align:center; background:#fbb;"		
|59||June 4||@Padres||3–6||Harang(6–2)||A. Rodríguez (0–3)||Bell (16)||28,208||Petco Park||23–36||L2
|-  style="text-align:center; background:#fbb;"	
|60||June 5||@Padres||2–7||Latos (4–6)||Lyles (0–1)||||21,958||Petco Park||23–37||L3
|-  style="text-align:center; background:#fbb;"		
|61||June 7||Cardinals||4–7||Westbrook (6–3)||Myers (2–5)||Salas (11)||23,277||Minute Maid Park||23–38||L4
|-  style="text-align:center; background:#bfb;"	
|62||June 8||Cardinals||4–1||Norris (4–4)||García (6–2)||Melancon (6)||22,107||Minute Maid Park||24–38||W1
|-  style="text-align:center; background:#fbb;"	
|63||June 9||Cardinals||2–9||Lynn (1–1)||Happ (3–8)||||24,482||Minute Maid Park||24–39||L1	
|-  style="text-align:center; background:#fbb;"
|64||June 10||Braves||4–11||Hudson (5–5)||A. Rodríguez (0–4)||||29,252||Minute Maid Park||24–40||L2
|-  style="text-align:center; background:#fbb;"
|65||June 11||Braves||3–6 (10)||Linebrink (2–1)||Lyon (3–3)||||32,117||Minute Maid Park||24–41||L3	
|-  style="text-align:center; background:#fbb;"
|66||June 12||Braves||1–4||Hudson (8–4)||Myers (2–6)||Venters (3)||23,765||Minute Maid Park||24–42||L4	
|-  style="text-align:center; background:#bfb;"
|67||June 13||Braves||8–3||W. Rodríguez (4–3)||Lowe (3–5)||||21,466||Minute Maid Park||25–42||W1	
|-  style="text-align:center; background:#fbb;"
|68||June 14||Pirates||0–1||Karstens (4–4)||Norris (4–5)||Hanrahan (18)||29,712||Minute Maid Park||25–43||L1
|-  style="text-align:center; background:#fbb;"	
|69||June 15||Pirates||3–7||Morton (7–3)||Del Rosario (0–1)||Hanrahan (19)||29,866||Minute Maid Park||25–44||L2
|-  style="text-align:center; background:#fbb;"	
|70||June 16||Pirates||4–5||McDonald (5–4)||Lyles (0–2)||Veras (1)||26,415||Minute Maid Park||25–45||L3
|-  style="text-align:center; background:#bfb;"		
|71||June 17||@Dodgers||7–3||Myers (3–6)||Lilly (5–6)||||35,053||Dodger Stadium||26–45||W1
|-  style="text-align:center; background:#bfb;"	
|72||June 18||@Dodgers||7–0||W. Rodríguez (5–3)||De La Rosa (3–1)||||36,124||Dodger Stadium||27–45||W2
|-  style="text-align:center; background:#fbb;"		
|73||June 19||@Dodgers||0–1||Guerrier (3–3)||López (1–3)||Guerra (2)||44,665||Dodger Stadium||27–46||L1	
|-  style="text-align:center; background:#fbb;"	
|74||June 20||@Rangers||3–8||Holland (6–2)||Happ (3–9)||||41,205||Rangers Ballpark in Arlington||27–47||L2		
|-  style="text-align:center; background:#fbb;"	
|75||June 21||@Rangers||4–5 (11)||Tateyama (1–0)||Del Rosario (0–2)||||33,533||Rangers Ballpark in Arlington||27–48||L3	
|-  style="text-align:center; background:#bfb;"	
|76||June 22||@Rangers||5–3||Melancon (5–1)||Feliz (0–1)||||39,708||Rangers Ballpark in Arlington||28–48||W1	
|-  style="text-align:center; background:#fbb;"	
|77||June 24||Rays||1–5||Shields (8–4)||W. Rodríguez (5–4)||||26,682||Minute Maid Park||28–49||L1	
|-  style="text-align:center; background:#fbb;"
|78||June 25||Rays||2–7||Davis (7–5)||Norris (4–6)||Farnsworth (16)||27,208||Minute Maid Park||28–50||L2
|-  style="text-align:center; background:#fbb;"
|79||June 26||Rays||10–14||Howell (1–1)||López (1–4)||||23,965||Minute Maid Park||28–51||L3
|-  style="text-align:center; background:#fbb;"
|80||June 28||Rangers||3–7||Wilson (6–3)||Lyles (0–3)||Feliz (15)||29,132||Minute Maid Park||28–52||L4
|-  style="text-align:center; background:#fbb;"
|81||June 29||Rangers||2–3||Lewis (7–7)||Myers (3–7)||Feliz (16)||24,472||Minute Maid Park||28–53||L5
|-  style="text-align:center; background:#bfb;"	
|82||June 30||Rangers||7–0||W. Rodríguez (6–4)||Harrison (6–7)||||25,938||Minute Maid Park||29–53||W1	
|-

|-  style="text-align:center; background:#fbb;"
|83||July 1||Red Sox||5–7||Wheeler (1–1)||Escalona (1–1)||Papelbon (16)||36,279||Minute Maid Park||29–54||L1
|-  style="text-align:center; background:#fbb;"
|84||July 2||Red Sox||4–10||Miller (2–0)||Happ (3–10)||||39,021||Minute Maid Park||29–55||L2
|-  style="text-align:center; background:#fbb;"
|85||July 3||Red Sox||1–2||Beckett (7–3)||Melancon (5–2)||Papelbon (17)||38,035||Minute Maid Park||29–56||L3
|-  style="text-align:center; background:#fbb;"
|86||July 4||@Pirates||3–5||Maholm (5–9)||Myers (3–8)||Hanrahan (25)||36,942||PNC Park||29–57||L4
|-  style="text-align:center; background:#fbb;"
|87||July 5||@Pirates||1–5||Karstens (7–4)||W. Rodríguez (6–5)||||18,151||PNC Park||29–58||L5
|-  style="text-align:center; background:#bfb;"	
|88||July 6||@Pirates||8–2||Norris (5–6)||Morton (7–5)||||18,910||PNC Park||30–58||W1
|-  style="text-align:center; background:#fbb;"	
|89||July 7||@Marlins||0–5||Hand (1–3)||Happ (3–11)||||17,806||Sun Life Stadium||30–59||L1
|-  style="text-align:center; background:#fbb;"	
|90||July 8||@Marlins||3–6||Vázquez (5–8)||Lyles (0–4)||Núñez (24)||17,044||Sun Life Stadium||30–60||L2
|-  style="text-align:center; background:#fbb;"	
|91||July 9||@Marlins||1–6||Nolasco (6–5)||Myers (3–9)||||20,402||Sun Life Stadium||30–61||L3
|-  style="text-align:center; background:#fbb;"		
|92||July 10||@Marlins||4–5||Volstad (5–8)||W. Rodríguez (6–6)||Núñez (25)||17,123||Sun Life Stadium||30–62||L4
|-  style="text-align:center; background:#bbcaff;"
|–||July 12|| 82nd All-Star Game||colspan=8|National League 5,   American League 1   (Phoenix, Arizona;  Chase Field)
|-  style="text-align:center; background:#fbb;"		
|93||July 15||Pirates||0–4||Karstens (8–4)||Myers (3–10)||||27,787||Minute Maid Park||30–63||L5
|-  style="text-align:center; background:#bfb;"		
|94||July 16||Pirates||6–4||Escalona (2–1)||Veras (2–2)||Melancon (7)||35,081||Minute Maid Park||31–63||W1
|-  style="text-align:center; background:#fbb;"	
|95||July 17||Pirates||5–7 (11)||Leroux (1–0)||Melancon (5–3)||Resop (1)||24,580||Minute Maid Park||31–64||L1
|-  style="text-align:center; background:#fbb;"		
|96||July 18||Nationals||2–5||Marquis (8–4)||Lyles (0–5)||Storen (25)||28,975||Minute Maid Park||31–65||L2
|-  style="text-align:center; background:#bfb;"	
|97||July 19||Nationals||7–6||Happ (4–11)||Zimmermann (6–8)||Melancon (8)||32,418||Minute Maid Park||32–65||W1
|-  style="text-align:center; background:#bfb;"		
|98||July 20||Nationals||3–2 (11)||López (2–4)||Coffey (3–1)||||29,605||Minute Maid Park||33–65||W2
|-  style="text-align:center; background:#fbb;"	
|99||July 22||@Cubs||2–4||Zambrano (7–5)||Norris (5–7)||Marshall (3)||39,855||Wrigley Field||33–66||L1
|-  style="text-align:center; background:#fbb;"	
|100||July 23||@Cubs||1–5||Wells (2–3)||W. Rodríguez (6–7)||||40,486||Wrigley Field||33–67||L2
|-  style="text-align:center; background:#fbb;"	
|101||July 24||@Cubs||4–5 (10)||John Grabow (2–0)||Carpenter (0–1)||||40,406||Wrigley Field||33–68||L3
|-  style="text-align:center; background:#fbb;"	
|102||July 25||@Cardinals||5–10||McClellan (7–6)||Happ (4–12)||Boggs (4)||38,074||Busch Stadium||33–69||L4
|-  style="text-align:center; background:#fbb;"	
|103||July 26||@Cardinals||1–3||Westbrook (9–4)||Myers (3–11)||Salas (19)||35,588||Busch Stadium||33–70||L5	
|-  style="text-align:center; background:#bfb;"	
|104||July 27||@Cardinals||4–2||F. Rodriguez (2–0)||Boggs (0–3)||Melancon (9)||35,679||Busch Stadium||34–70||W1	
|-  style="text-align:center; background:#bfb;"	
|105||July 28||@Cardinals||5–3||W. Rodríguez (7–7)||García (10–5)||Melancon (10)||38,794||Busch Stadium||35–70||W2	
|-  style="text-align:center; background:#fbb;"
|106||July 29||@Brewers||0–4||Wolf (7–8)||Lyles (0–6)||||41,672||Miller Park||35–71||L1
|-  style="text-align:center; background:#fbb;"	
|107||July 30||@Brewers||2–6||Gallardo (12–7)||Happ (4–13)||||44,306||Miller Park||35–72||L2
|-  style="text-align:center; background:#fbb;"	
|108||July 31||@Brewers||4–5||Rodríguez (4–2)||F. Rodríguez (2–1)||Axford (31)||41,738||Miller Park||35–73||L3	
|-

|-  style="text-align:center; background:#bfb;"
|109||August 1||Reds||4–3 (10)||Melancon (6–3)||Ondrusek (4–4)||||21,502||Minute Maid Park||36–73||W1
|-  style="text-align:center; background:#fbb;"	
|110||August 2||Reds||1–5||Bailey (6–5)||W. Rodríguez (7–8)||||22,603||Minute Maid Park||36–74||L1
|-  style="text-align:center; background:#bfb;"
|111||August 3||Reds||5–4||Lyles (1–6)||Masset (1–5)||Melancon (11)||22,102||Minute Maid Park||37–74||W1
|-  style="text-align:center; background:#fbb;"	
|112||August 5||Brewers||1–8||Gallardo (13–7)||Happ (4–14)||||25,811||Minute Maid Park||37–75||L1
|-  style="text-align:center; background:#fbb;"	
|113||August 6||Brewers||5–7||Narveson (8–6)||Myers (3–12)||Axford (32)||30,561||Minute Maid Park||37–76||L2
|-  style="text-align:center; background:#fbb;"	
|114||August 7||Brewers||3–7||Greinke (10–4)||Norris (5–8)||||22,885||Minute Maid Park||37–77||L3
|-  style="text-align:center; background:#bfb;"
|115||August 8||@Diamondbacks||9–1||W. Rodríguez (8–8)||Hudson (11–8)||||17,448||Chase Field||38–77||W1
|-  style="text-align:center; background:#fbb;"	
|116||August 9||@Diamondbacks||9–11||Owings (6–0)||López (2–5)||Putz (27)||17,814||Chase Field||38–78||L1
|-  style="text-align:center; background:#fbb;"	
|117||August 10||@Diamondbacks||3–6||Collmenter (7–7)||Sosa (0–1)||Hernandez (10)||18,628||Chase Field||38–79||L2
|-  style="text-align:center; background:#fbb;"	
|118||August 11||@Diamondbacks||5–8 (10)||Putz (2–2)||Fulchino (1–4)||||18,418||Chase Field||38–80||L3
|-  style="text-align:center; background:#fbb;"	
|119||August 12||@Dodgers||0–1 (10)||Lindblom (1–0)||Carpenter (0–2)||||33,642||Dodger Stadium||38–81||L4
|-  style="text-align:center; background:#fbb;"	
|120||August 13||@Dodgers||1–6||Kershaw (14–5)||W. Rodríguez (8–9)||||36,111||Dodger Stadium||38–82||L5
|-  style="text-align:center; background:#fbb;"	
|121||August 14||@Dodgers||0–7||Kuroda (8–14)||Lyles (1–7)||||36,339||Dodger Stadium||38–83||L6
|-  style="text-align:center; background:#fbb;"	
|122||August 15||Cubs||3–4||López (4–3)||Sosa (0–2)||Wood (1)||20,138||Minute Maid Park||38–84||L7
|-  style="text-align:center; background:#bfb;"
|123||August 16||Cubs||6–5||A. Rodríguez (1–4)||Mármol (2–4)||||23,736||Minute Maid Park||39–84||W1
|-  style="text-align:center; background:#bfb;"
|124||August 17||Cubs||4–3||Norris (6–8)||Coleman (2–5)||Melancon (12)||24,054||Minute Maid Park||40–84||W2
|-  style="text-align:center; background:#bfb;"
|125||August 19||Giants||6–0||W. Rodríguez (9–9)||Vogelsong (10–3)||||26,259||Minute Maid Park||41–84||W3
|-  style="text-align:center; background:#bfb;"
|126||August 20||Giants||7–5||Lyles (2–7)||Bumgarner (7–12)||Melancon (13)||29,046||Minute Maid Park||42–84||W4
|-  style="text-align:center; background:#fbb;"	
|127||August 21||Giants||4–6 (11)||Affeldt (2–2)||Melancon (6–4)||Ramírez (3)||25,838||Minute Maid Park||42–85||L1
|-  style="text-align:center; background:#fbb;"	
|128||August 22||@Rockies||5–9||Chacín (10–10)||Myers (3–13)||Betancourt (3)||27,166||Coors Field||42–86||L1
|-  style="text-align:center; background:#fbb;"	
|129||August 23||@Rockies||6–8||Belisle (8–4)||F. Rodriguez (2–2)||Brothers (1)||31,179||Coors Field||42–87||L2
|-  style="text-align:center; background:#fbb;"	
|130||August 24||@Rockies||6–7 (10)||Belisle (9–4)||A. Rodríguez (1–5)||||30,333||Coors Field||42–88||L3
|-  style="text-align:center; background:#bfb;"
|131||August 25||@Giants||3–1||Sosa (1–2)||Vogelsong (10–4)||Melancon (14)||41,115||AT&T Park||43–88||W1
|-  style="text-align:center; background:#fbb;"	
|132||August 26||@Giants||1–2||Bumgarner (8–12)||Happ (4–15)||Casilla (2)||41,438 ||AT&T Park||43–89||L1
|-  style="text-align:center; background:#fbb;"	
|133||August 27||@Giants||1–2 (10)||Affeldt (3–2)||F. Rodriguez (2–3)||||42,318||AT&T Park||43–90||L2
|-  style="text-align:center; background:#bfb;"
|134||August 28||@Giants||4–3 (11)||Melancon (7–4)||Ramírez (2–3)||Carpenter (1)||41,681||AT&T Park||44–90||W1
|-  style="text-align:center; background:#bfb;"
|135||August 29||Pirates||7–4||W. Rodríguez (10–9)||Grilli (1–1)||Melancon (15)||19,250||Minute Maid Park||45–90||W2
|-  style="text-align:center; background:#bfb;"
|136||August 30||Pirates||8–2||Sosa (2–2)||Morton (9–8)||||21,750||Minute Maid Park||46–90||W3
|-  style="text-align:center; background:#bfb;"
|137||August 31||Pirates||2–0||Happ (5–15)||McDonald (8–7)||Melancon (16)||22,918||Minute Maid Park||47–90||W4
|-

|-  style="text-align:center; background:#fbb;"	
|138||September 2||Brewers||2–8||Greinke (14–5)||A. Rodríguez (1–6)||||20,045||Minute Maid Park||47–91||L1
|-  style="text-align:center; background:#fbb;"	
|139||September 3||Brewers||2–8||Narveson (10–6)||Norris (6–9)||||24,982||Minute Maid Park||47–92||L2
|-  style="text-align:center; background:#fbb;"	
|140||September 4||Brewers||0–4||Marcum (12–5)||W. Rodríguez (10–10)||||21,976||Minute Maid Park||47–93||L3
|-  style="text-align:center; background:#fbb;"	
|141||September 5||@Pirates||1–3||McDonald (9–7)||Sosa (2–3)||Hanrahan (35)||13,366||PNC Park||47–94||L4
|-  style="text-align:center; background:#bfb;"
|142||September 6||@Pirates||4–1||Myers (4–13)||Lincoln (1–2)||Melancon (17)||9,840||PNC Park||48–94||W1
|-  style="text-align:center; background:#fbb;"	
|143||September 7||@Pirates||4–5||Watson (2–2)||López (2–6)||Hanrahan (36)||12,330||PNC Park||48–95||L1
|-  style="text-align:center; background:#fbb;"	
|144||September 9||@Nationals||3–4||Clippard (3-0)||Harrell (0-1)||||18,307||Nationals Park||48-96||L2
|-  style="text-align:center; background:#bfb;"
|145||September 10||@Nationals||9–3||W. Rodríguez (11–10)||Lannan (9–12)||||30,935||Nationals Park||49-96||W1
|-  style="text-align:center; background:#fbb;"	
|146||September 11||@Nationals||2–8||Gorzelanny (3–6)||Sosa (2–4)||||24,238||Nationals Park||49-97||L1
|-  style="text-align:center; background:#bfb;"
|147||September 12||Phillies||5–1||Myers (5–13)||Oswalt (7–9)||||22,231||Minute Maid Park||50-97||W1
|-  style="text-align:center; background:#bfb;"
|148||September 13||Phillies||5–2||Happ (6–15)||Hamels (14–8)||||24,302||Minute Maid Park||51-97||W2
|-  style="text-align:center; background:#fbb;"	
|149||September 14||Phillies||0–1||Halladay (18–5)||Norris (6–10)||||20,027||Minute Maid Park||51-98||L1
|-  style="text-align:center; background:#fbb;"	
|150||September 16||@Cubs||3–4||Samardzija (7–4)||Carpenter (0–3)||||35,318||Wrigley Field||51-99||L2
|-  style="text-align:center; background:#fbb;"	
|151||September 17||@Cubs||1–2||López (6–6)||Sosa (2-5)||Marshall (5)||39,377||Wrigley Field||51-100||L3
|-  style="text-align:center; background:#bfb;"
|152||September 18||@Cubs||3–2||Myers (6–13)||Dempster (10–13)||Melancon (18)||36,250||Wrigley Field||52-100||W1
|-  style="text-align:center; background:#bfb;"
|153||September 19||@Reds||3–2||Carpenter (1–3)||Masset (3–6)||Melancon (19)||21,168||Great American Ball Park||53-100||W2
|-  style="text-align:center; background:#fbb;"	
|154||September 20||@Reds||4–6||Bailey (9–7)||Norris (6–11)||Cordero (34)||23,847||Great American Ball Park||53-101||L1
|-  style="text-align:center; background:#fbb;"	
|155||September 21||@Reds||0–2||Arroyo (9–12)||W. Rodríguez (11–11)||||20,875||Great American Ball Park||53-102||L2
|-  style="text-align:center; background:#bfb;"
|156||September 22||Rockies||9–6||Sosa (3-5)||White (3–3)||Melancon (20)||20,773||Minute Maid Park||54-102||W1
|-  style="text-align:center; background:#bfb;"
|157||September 23||Rockies||11–2||Myers (7–13)||Pomeranz (1-1)||||22,467||Minute Maid Park||55-102||W2
|-  style="text-align:center; background:#fbb;"	
|158||September 24||Rockies||2–4 (13)||Reynolds (1-2)||Lyles (2–8)||Betancourt (7)||26,209||Minute Maid Park||55-103||L1
|-  style="text-align:center; background:#fbb;"	
|159||September 25||Rockies||3–19||Millwood (4-3)||Harrell (0-2)||||21,621||Minute Maid Park||55-104||L2
|-  style="text-align:center; background:#bfb;"
|160||September 26||Cardinals||5–4 (10)||Melancon (8-4)||Dotel (18)||||20,017||Minute Maid Park||56-104||W1
|-  style="text-align:center; background:#fbb;"	
|161||September 27||Cardinals||6–13||Sánchez (0–3)||Del Rosario (0–3)||||22,021||Minute Maid Park||56-105||L1
|-  style="text-align:center; background:#fbb;"	
|162||September 28||Cardinals||0–8||Carpenter (11–9)||Myers (7–14)||||24,358||Minute Maid Park||56-106||L2
|-

Player stats

Batting
Note: G=Games played; AB=At bats; R=Runs scored; H=Hits; 2B=Doubles; 3B=Triples; HR=Home runs; RBI=Runs batted in; BB=Base on balls; SO=Strikeouts; SB=Stolen bases; AVG=Batting average

 Source: « Houston Astros Batting Stats »
x Was not part of the team at end of the season

Pitching
Note: W=Wins; L=Losses; ERA=Earned run average; G=Games pitched; GS=Games started; SV=Saves; IP=Innings pitched; H=Hits allowed; R=Runs allowed; ER=Earned runs allowed; HR=Home runs allowed; BB=Walks allowed; SO=Strikeouts 

 Source: « Houston Astros Pitching Stats »

Farm system

External links
2011 Houston Astros season official site
2011 Houston Astros season at Baseball Reference

Houston Astros seasons
Houston Astros
2011 in sports in Texas